Naples, California may refer to:
Naples, Santa Barbara County, California, an unincorporated community
Naples, Long Beach, a neighborhood of Long Beach, California